Licia Nunez - Lucia Del Curatolo (born 1978 in Barletta, Italy) is an Italian television and movie actress.

Selected filmography 
 Alla fine della notte (2003)
 Balletto di guerra (2004) 
 Goodbye Mama, (2011)
 Una vita in regalo (2004)
 Incantesimo 7-8-9 (2004-2006)
 Vivere (2004, 2007-2008)
 R.I.S. - Delitti imperfetti (2005)
 L'ultimo rigore 2 (2005) 
 Coppie (2001) 
 I carnefici (2001)
 Le tre rose di Eva (2012-2018)

TV 
 Notti mondiali – Co-host with Marco Mazzocchi – Rai Uno (2006)
 Vivere da campioni – Co-host with Corrado Tedeschi – Rai Uno 
 Eurogol – Co-host with Stefano Bizzotto – Rai Due
 Ballando con le Stelle – Reality show – Rai Uno (2009, season 5) – Contestant
 Grande Fratello VIP – Reality show – Canale 5 (2020, season 4) – Contestant
 L'Isola dei Famosi – Reality show – Canale 5 (2022, season 16) – Contestant

Personal life
From 2006 to 2010, Licia was engaged to activist and politician Imma Battaglia.

Since 2018, she is engaged to entrepreneur Barbara Eboli.

References

External links 
 

1980 births
Living people
People from Barletta
Italian stage actresses
Italian film actresses
Italian television actresses
21st-century Italian actresses
Italian LGBT actors
Participants in Italian reality television series
20th-century Italian LGBT people
21st-century Italian LGBT people